The 9th National Hockey League All-Star Game took place at the Detroit Olympia, home of the Detroit Red Wings, on October 2, 1955. The Red Wings, winner of the 1955 Stanley Cup Finals, played a team of All-Stars, winning by a score of 3–1.

Uniforms
When the NHL mandated that all teams must have a white jersey beginning with the 1951-52 NHL season, the league at the time chose to make the white jersey the designated home uniform. However, prior to the 1955-56 season, the NHL reversed the designation, requiring home teams to wear their dark jerseys and visitors to wear white. As the first All-Star Game under these rules, the Red Wings wore their red uniforms, while the All-Stars wore the white uniforms worn by the Second Team All-Stars in 1951 and 1952. The white All-Star uniform with blue and red trim would continue to be worn through 1959. The white jersey would be adapted into a throwback worn by the Wales Conference All-Stars in the 1992 All-Star Game.

Game summary

Referee: Frank Udvari
Linesmen: George Hayes, Scotty Morrison

Notes

Named to the first All-Star team in 1954–55.
Named to the second All-Star team in 1954–55.

Citations

References
 

09th National Hockey League All-Star Game
All-Star Game
1956
Ice hockey competitions in Detroit
October 1955 sports events in the United States
1955 in Detroit